Simsim may refer to:

The Simsim caves in the Tarim Basin
Simsir, a medieval Chechen state centered around the Sunzha river 
Simsim, the word for sesame in various Semitic languages.  Also widely used in Arab-influenced East Africa
Simsim, Gaza, a Palestinian Arab village depopulated in 1948 in what is today Israel
Alam Simsim, the Egyptian version of the children's television series Sesame Street
Iftah Ya Simsim, the Kuwaiti version of Sesame Street
Shara'a Simsim, the Palestinian version of Sesame Street